Luis Saúl Silva López (born 10 December 1988) is a Mexican former professional footballer who played as an attacking midfielder or forward.

Playing career

Youth and college 
Silva was born in Oaxaca, Mexico, and moved to Los Angeles at a young age. Silva spent two years playing with local youth club Pateadores, helping them win the Premier Division in 2006, as well as spending two years with C.D. Chivas USA's U-19 team. Silva attended Bishop Mora Salesian High School in Los Angeles where he was a two-time All-CIF selection as a midfielder and forward. He was named Offensive Player of the Year in the 2007 season when he helped the Mustangs win the CIF Southern Section Championship and scored a goal in the Mustangs' 6–1 romp over Pasadena Marshall as the team set a finals scoring record. He went on to play collegiately with the UC Santa Barbara Gauchos. He was named to the All-Big West First Team three times. In his senior year, Silva scored 17 goals and added 10 assists, garnering recognition as a MAC Hermann Trophy Semifinalist.

Club 
During his college years, Silva also played in the USL Premier Development League for Orange County Blue Star in 2011.  He joined UCSB teammates Charley Pettys and Christian Ramirez on the squad and finished with 5 goals and 2 assists in 10 matches played.

Luis Silva was selected 4th overall by Toronto FC in the first round of the 2012 MLS SuperDraft. Silva made his debut for Toronto FC on March 7, 2012, scoring a goal against the Los Angeles Galaxy in the 2011–12 CONCACAF Champions League quarterfinals. Silva scored his first league goal against Vancouver Whitecaps on July 11, the game ended in a 3–2 home victory. Three days after his first league goal, he scored the lone goal in an away victory over New England Revolution.

On July 9, 2013, it was announced that Silva had been traded to fellow MLS side D.C. United in exchange for allocation money. Silva appeared in the 2013 U.S. Open Cup Final on October 1, 2013, in the 75th minute and helped D.C. win 1–0 against Real Salt Lake and secure United's third U.S. Open Cup Championship. Silva scored a first half hat-trick against the Montreal Impact at Saputo Stadium on June 11, 2014, leading D.C. United to a 4–2 win.

On July 16, 2015, it was announced that Silva had been traded to MLS team Real Salt Lake for Álvaro Saborío. Silva ended his D.C. United career with totals of 15 goals and six assists in 54 appearances, including a career-best 11 goals in 2014. In 2016, he moved to Liga MX side Tigres UANL.

On March 6, 2019, Silva joined Veikkausliiga side Honka on a one-year deal with an option for an additional year. He left the club in August to return to the United States, signing with Seattle Sounders FC in MLS. Silva and Seattle went on to win the 2019 MLS Cup. He was released by Seattle at the end of the 2019 season.

Career statistics

Honours 
Toronto FC
Canadian Championship: 2012

D.C. United
U.S. Open Cup: 2013

Tigres UANL
Liga MX: Apertura 2016

Seattle Sounders FC
MLS Cup: 2019

References

External links 

 
 UC Santa Barbara player profile

1988 births
Living people
All-American men's college soccer players
American expatriate soccer players
American expatriate sportspeople in Canada
American soccer players
American sportspeople of Mexican descent
Association football midfielders
D.C. United players
Expatriate soccer players in Canada
FC Honka players
Footballers from Oaxaca
Major League Soccer players
Orange County Blue Star players
Real Salt Lake players
Seattle Sounders FC players
Soccer players from Los Angeles
Toronto FC draft picks
Toronto FC players
UC Santa Barbara Gauchos men's soccer players
USL League Two players
Mexican footballers